Alina Bivol (born January 19, 1996) is a Russian chess player.

Bivol was granted the Woman International Master title in 2013. Her three norms were scoring 6 points out of 10 games in Kimry in 2009, 4.5/9 in Kostroma and 5/9 at the Chigorin Memorial in 2012.

In 2015, she won the Russian Under-21 Girls' Championship and finished second on tiebreak in the World Junior Championship, half a point behind Nataliya Buksa.

References

External links

1996 births
Living people
Russian female chess players
Place of birth missing (living people)